Plácido Rodríguez C.M.F. (born October 11, 1940) is a Mexican-born American prelate of the Catholic Church.  He served as bishop of the Diocese of Lubbock in Texas from 1994 to 2015 and as an auxiliary bishop of the Archdiocese of San Antonio in Texas from 1983 to 1994.

Biography

Early life 
Plácido Rodríguez was born on October 11, 1940, in Celaya, Mexico to Eutimio and Maria Conception. He was the 11th born out of 14 children; his family emigrated to Chicago in 1953, when he was twelve years old.

Rodríguez attended Saint Francis Assisi Parish School in Chicago, then St. Jude's Seminary in Momence, Illinois.  He then entered entered the Claretian Novitiate in Los Angeles, making his first profession of vows in 1960.

After finishing at the novitiate, Rodríguez entered Claretian College Seminary in Calabasas, California, graduating in 1964. He then attended the Catholic University of America in Washington, D.C.  Rodríguez took his perpetual vows with the Claretians in 1967 and graduated from Catholic University in 1988, receiving a Licentiate in Sacred Theology and a Bachelor of Sacred Theology degree.

Priesthood 
Rodríguez was ordained into the priesthood by Bishop Thomas Grady for the Claretian Order on May 23, 1968.

After his ordination, Rodríguez was assigned as an associate pastor at Our Lady of Guadalupe Parish in South Chicago.  During this period, he earned a Master of Urban Studies degree in 1971 from Loyola University Chicago.  In 1975, Rodríguez was appointed vocation director for the Claretian's eastern province, a job he held for six years. In 1981, Rodríguez was named pastor of Our Lady of Fatima Parish in Perth Amboy, New Jersey.

Auxiliary Bishop of Chicago 
Rodríguez was appointed as an auxiliary bishop of the Archdiocese of Chicago and titular bishop of Fuerteventura by Pope John Paul II on October 18, 1983. He was consecrated by Cardinal Joseph Bernadin on December 13, 1983.

Bishop of Lubbock 
Rodríguez was appointed as bishop of the Diocese of Lubbock on April 5, 1994, by John Paul II.  He was installed on June 1, 1994 in the Lubbock Memorial Coliseum in Lubbock, Texas.

In January 2004, Rodriguez released a list of five priests and one deacon with credible allegations of sexual abuse of minors.  Most of the cases dated back before the formation of the diocese.  The men on the list were either deceased or already removed from ministry.

Retirement 
After reaching the mandatory retirement age of 75 on October 11, 2015,  Rodríguez submitted his letter of resignation as bishop of Lubbock to Pope Francis. The pope accepted it on September 27, 2016.   Rodríguez retired to Chicago to return to the Claretian Order, actively working in the promotion of priestly vocations.

See also
 

 Catholic Church hierarchy
 Catholic Church in the United States
 Historical list of the Catholic bishops of the United States
 List of Catholic bishops of the United States
 Lists of patriarchs, archbishops, and bishops

References

External links
 Roman Catholic Diocese of Lubbock Official Site
 https://twitter.com/bprodriguezcmf
 Article title
 https://www.ncronline.org/news/world/holy-land-us-bishops-say-building-walls-does-no-good
 https://ctkcathedral.org/people/most-rev-plcido-rodrguez-cmf
 http://www.everythinglubbock.com/news/local-news/plcido-rodrguez-cmf-writes-pope-francis-to-request-retirement/246803513
 http://catholiclubbock.org/images/SPC.pdf
 http://www.olvradio.com/
 https://www.catholic.com/

1940 births
Living people
People from Celaya
Mexican emigrants to the United States
Roman Catholic Ecclesiastical Province of San Antonio
20th-century Roman Catholic bishops in the United States
Roman Catholic Archdiocese of Chicago
Religious leaders from Texas
Religious leaders from Illinois
21st-century Roman Catholic bishops in the United States